Kevin Ronald Leech (born August 1943) is a British entrepreneur, involved with Land's End and the Snowdon Mountain Railway.

References

Living people
1943 births
British businesspeople